Yakhyo Imamov (born December 24, 1989 in Samarqand Province) is an Uzbekistani judoka. He competed in the men's 81 kg event at the 2012 Summer Olympics and was eliminated in the second round by Kim Jae-Bum.

References

External links
 
 

1989 births
Living people
Uzbekistani male judoka
Olympic judoka of Uzbekistan
Judoka at the 2012 Summer Olympics
Judoka at the 2014 Asian Games
Kurash practitioners at the 2018 Asian Games
Asian Games medalists in judo
Asian Games medalists in kurash
Asian Games silver medalists for Uzbekistan
Asian Games bronze medalists for Uzbekistan
Universiade medalists in judo
Medalists at the 2014 Asian Games
Medalists at the 2018 Asian Games
Universiade silver medalists for Uzbekistan
Medalists at the 2013 Summer Universiade
20th-century Uzbekistani people
21st-century Uzbekistani people